On Nut Road is a soi (alley)-formed road in Bangkok. It is a separate section of Sukhumvit Road (Highway 3) known as Soi Sukhumvit 77 (ซอยสุขุมวิท 77) and also the name of the same neighbourhood that it crosses over.

It intersect with Srinakarin Road (Highway 3344) at Suan Luang (Si Nut) Junction to the same direction, then crossing Khlong Nong Bon into Prawet District. In this section, it also served as the administrative demarcation line between Nong Bon and Dokmai Subdistricts from Prawet Subdistrict.

The road continues running to meet Phatthanakan Road at the On Nut-Phatthanakan Interchange, then eastward cut across Chaloem Phra Kiat Ratchakan Thi 9 Road at Prawet Intersection. The road intersect with Kanchanaphisek Road (Eastern Outer Ring Road) at On Nut Intersection and cut across Sukhaphiban 2 Road at the junction of Sirindhorn Hospital before terminating at Soi On Nut 90 (Sirindhorn Hospital) on the seam between the three subdistricts of two districts; Prawet  and Dokmai Subdistricts in Prawet District with Lat Krabang Subdistrict in Lat Krabang District, Lat Krabang Road is continuous route.

Wat Mahabut in Soi On Nut 7 is the site of the shrine dedicated to Mae Nak Phra Khanong, a well-known Thai female ghost.

Its name "On Nut", was set in honour of the surname of the land donor to build the early section of the road.

Saphan San Samran (สะพานแสนสำราญ, "joyfully bridge") is the bridge over Khlong Phra Khanong in Soi On Nut 1/1 (Habito Road) that has a curve and beautiful scenery with the high-rise condominium complexes as a backdrop. Therefore, it is a popular photo check-in point for teenagers.

On Nut can be considered as one of the important streets of eastern Bangkok, in terms of being a shortcut to various main roads, also a source of residence and communities that are important. Hence a neighbourhood with condominiums and international schools as well as a large number of residences of both Thais and foreigners.

See more
On Nut Subdistrict – administrative district of Suan Luang District is named after the road

References

Streets in Bangkok
Neighbourhoods of Bangkok